Lier is a railway station in Lier, Antwerp, Belgium. The station opened in 1855 on the Line 13 and Line 15. Until 1988 the station was also on 205, when this line closed.

Train services
The station is served by the following services:

Intercity services (IC-09) Antwerp - Lier - Aarschot - Leuven (weekdays)
Intercity services (IC-10) Antwerp - Mol - Hamont/Hasselt
Intercity services (IC-11) Binche - Braine-le-Comte - Halle - Brussels - Mechelen - Turnhout (weekdays)
Intercity services (IC-30) Antwerp - Herentals - Turnhout
Local services (L-23) Antwerp - Lier - Aarschot - Leuven
Local services (L-24) Antwerp - Herentals - Mol (weekdays)

Bus services

These bus services depart from the bus station outside the station. They are operated by De Lijn.

2 (Station - Duffel)
3 (Station - Kessel - Emblem)
130 (Lier - Kontich - Wilrijk)
131 (Lier - Kontich - Wilrijk)
132 (Lier - Kontich - Boom)
135 (Lier - Kontich - Wilrijk via Dungelhoeff)
150 (Lier - Nijlen - Herentals)
151 (Lier - Nijlen - Herenthout)
152 (Lier - Nijlen - Grobbendonk - Vorselaar)
153 (Lier - Nijlen Sint-Paulus)
154 (Lier - Kessel)
422 (Antwerpen - Broechem - Lier)
423 (Antwerpen - Broechem - Emblem - Lier via Draaiboom)
425 (Oelegem - Broechem - Lier)
426 (Oelegem - Ranst - Broechem - Lier)
428 (Varselaar - Broechem - Lier)
550 (Mechelen Gandhistraat - Elzestraat - Duffel - Lier)
555 (Lier - Duffel - Rumst)
556 (Lier - Duffel - Waarloos)
560 (Mechelen - Sint-Katelinjne-Waver - Lier via Beukheuvel)
561 (Mechelen - Sint-Katelinjne-Waver - Lier via Berlaarbaan)
570 (Lier - Berlaar Heikant - Berlaar)
571 (Lier - Berlaar Heikant - Putte - Lier)

References

External links
Belgian Railways website
De Lijn website

Railway stations opened in 1855
Railway stations in Belgium
Railway stations in Antwerp Province
1855 establishments in Belgium